Faqueer Shahabuddin Ahmad was the first Attorney General of Bangladesh from 1972 to 1976.

Ahmad 
Ahmad is listed as a freedom fighter by the Government of Bangladesh for his role in the 1971 Bangladesh Liberation war.

In 1972, Ahmad was appointed the first Attorney General of Bangladesh and Syed Ishtiaq Ahmed the Additional Attorney General.

As Attorney General Ahmad represented the government in their case against Messrs A. T. J. Industries Limited over abandoned property law.

Personal life 
Ahmad was married to Ayesha Akhtar. They had a daughter, Marina Ahmad, who resides in New York City, Mumbai, and Dhaka; and is a music teacher.

References 

Attorneys General of Bangladesh
20th-century Bangladeshi lawyers
20th-century Pakistani lawyers
St. Gregory's High School and College alumni